The 140th IOC Session is an upcoming IOC Session to be held in Mumbai, India in 2023.

Bidders

Mumbai stood as the only bidder to host the session. The IOC membership approved Mumbai's application during the 2022 Winter Olympics in Beijing. This will mark the second time an IOC Session is held in India. The 86th IOC Session in 1983 was held in New Delhi. Due to several problems related to Indian Olympic Association, the session was delayed to either September or October 2023.

Agenda
Several items are expected to be on the agenda during the three day IOC Session. The host city for the 2030 Winter Olympics was initially going to be selected as this session, but the IOC has pushed back the date on that decision.

Optional Sports for 2028 Summer Olympics

The IOC is expected to finish the process for the adding the optional sports for the program of the 2028 Summer Olympics in Los Angeles. 

In August 2022, it was confirmed that nine sports had made bids to be included in the games, with presentations made later that month. They were:

 Cricket (International Cricket Council)
 Break-dancing (World DanceSport Federation)
 Baseball/softball (World Baseball Softball Confederation)
 Flag Football (International Federation of American Football) 
 Lacrosse (World Lacrosse)
 Karate (World Karate Federation)
 Kickboxing (World Association of Kickboxing Organizations)
 Squash (World Squash Federation) 
 Motorsport (Fédération Internationale de l'Automobile)

References

International Olympic Committee sessions
2023 in Indian sport
Sport in Mumbai
2023 conferences
Events in Mumbai
2020s in Mumbai
May 2023 sports events in India
IOC